Samoel Cojoc (born 8 July 1989) is a Romanian footballer who plays as a defender for Delta Dobrogea Tulcea. He played in Liga I for Oțelul Galați.

Controversy
In June 2013, Cojoc was involved in a street fight in Galați, in which he was stabbed in the abdomen.

Honours
Oţelul Galaţi
Liga I: 2010–11

References

External links

1989 births
Living people
Sportspeople from Galați
Romanian footballers
ASC Oțelul Galați players
FC Delta Dobrogea Tulcea players
Liga I players
Liga II players
Association football defenders